For a list of birds in New Zealand, see List of birds of New Zealand.
The birds of New Zealand evolved into an avifauna that included many endemic species found in no other country. As an island archipelago, New Zealand accumulated bird diversity, and when Captain James Cook arrived in the 1770s he noted that the bird song was deafening.

The mix includes species with unusual biology such as the kākāpō which is the world's only flightless, nocturnal parrot which also exhibits competitive display breeding using leks.

There are also many species that are similar to neighbouring land areas. A process of colonisation, speciation and extinction has been at play over many millions of years, including recent times. Some species have arrived in human recorded history while others arrived before but are little changed.

History after human settlement

When humans arrived in New Zealand about 700 years ago the environment changed quickly. Several species were hunted to extinction, most notably the moa (Dinornithidae) and Haast's eagle (Hieraaetus moorei). The most damage was caused by habitat destruction and the other animals humans brought with them, particularly rats – the Polynesian rat or kiore introduced by Māori and the brown rat and black rat subsequently introduced by Europeans. Mice, dogs, cats, stoats, weasels, pigs, goats, deer, hedgehogs, and Australian possums also put pressure upon native bird species. The flightless birds were especially sensitive.

Consequently, many bird species became extinct, and others remain critically endangered. Several species are now confined only to offshore islands, or to fenced "ecological islands" from which predators have been eliminated. New Zealand is today a world leader in the techniques required to bring severely endangered species back from the brink of extinction.

Many bird species were introduced during the early years of European settlement to control insects as New Zealand birds species generally preferred a native bush habitat rather than the open fields that the settlers were creating. Other species were introduced for sport and European birds also provide a connection with the settler's homelands as some areas of New Zealand had a starkly different appearance to the countries the settlers came from.

Comparison to global bird fauna

The terrestrial birds, wetland birds and seabirds in New Zealand each make up about a third of the total number of species. This is in sharp contrast to the composition of the global bird species where 90% are terrestrial.

When humans first arrived in New Zealand, there were at least 131 species of land, freshwater and coastal birds, and another 65 species of seabirds (gulls, albatrosses, petrels and penguins), making at least 196 native species in total, according to a 1997 report (this count may have risen since as subspecies have been reclassified as species). Of the 131 species that lived on or near land, 93 (or 71%) were endemic, and of the 65 seabirds, 22 (or 34%) were endemic, making 115 (or 59%) endemic species in total.

Conservation

Due to habitat loss, their historical use as a food source by Māori, and predation by introduced species, many birds have become extinct and numerous more are threatened with extinction. Huge conservation efforts are being made to save the takahē, kākāpō, mohua, kōkako, hihi and the kiwi. One well documented conservation success story, due in a large part to the efforts of Don Merton, is the saving of the black robin on the Chatham Islands.

From the time of first human settlement until 1994, 43 (or 46%) of the 93 endemic land, freshwater and coastal bird species have become extinct, as have 4 of the 22 endemic seabird species (making 41% of all endemic species extinct), according to a 1997 report. Fifteen species extinctions have occurred since 1840 (this count will have risen to 16 when the North Island snipe was raised from subspecies to species level). According to the 2005 New Zealand Threat Classification System list, 153 species or subspecies were then threatened with extinction.

See also
Biodiversity of New Zealand
Fauna of New Zealand
Forest & Bird, an organisation
List of birds of New Zealand
List of endemic birds of New Zealand
Ornithological Society of New Zealand, also known as Birds New Zealand
Parrots of New Zealand
Stoat in New Zealand

References

Further reading

External links
 New Zealand Birds Online: The digital encyclopaedia of New Zealand birds, managed by Birds New Zealand, the Department of Conservation and Te Papa.
 New Zealand Birds, by Narena Olliver
 Native Birds & Bats at Te Ara – the Encyclopedia of New Zealand